John Thomas Winsett (November 24, 1909 – July 20, 1987) was a professional baseball player. Nicknamed "Long Tom", he played all or part of seven seasons in Major League Baseball for the Boston Red Sox (1930–31, 1933), St. Louis Cardinals (1935) and Brooklyn Dodgers (1936–38), primarily as a left fielder. Winsett batted left-handed and threw right-handed. He was born in McKenzie, Tennessee.

In 1936, Winsett hit 50 home runs for the minor league Columbus Red Birds. He enjoyed his most productive major league season in 1937 with the Brooklyn Dodgers, when he posted career-highs in games played (118), runs (32), hits (83), doubles (15), triples (5), home runs (5) and runs batted in (42).  Winsett was a .237 career hitter with eight home runs and 76 RBI in 118 games.

On April 25, 1938, he was the first baseball player to be featured on the cover of LIFE magazine, with an inside caption which read: "The rubber-legged batter on the cover is John Thomas Winsett, of McKenzie, Tenn. one of the most curious players on the most curious team in the major leagues. He plays right field for the Brooklyn National League Baseball Club, better known as the 'Daffy Dodgers' because of the way they play. First time Winsett batted in a big-league game he hit a homer, but shortly went back to the minors. The Dodgers paid $40,000 for him last year and Winsett hit a dismal .237. Both Dodgers and Winsett are expected to play better this year."

He died in Memphis, Tennessee, at the age of 77.

References

External links

Retrosheet

Major League Baseball left fielders
Boston Red Sox players
St. Louis Cardinals players
Brooklyn Dodgers players
Meridian Mets players
Mobile Bears players
St. Paul Saints (AA) players
Dallas Steers players
Buffalo Bisons (minor league) players
Rochester Red Wings players
Columbus Red Birds players
Jersey City Giants players
Sacramento Solons players
Houston Buffaloes players
New Orleans Pelicans (baseball) players
Bethel Wildcats baseball players
Baseball players from Tennessee
1909 births
1987 deaths
People from McKenzie, Tennessee